A haboob is a type of intense dust storm carried on an atmospheric gravity current, also known as a weather front.  Haboobs occur regularly in dry land area regions throughout the world.

Description 

During thunderstorm formation, winds move in a direction opposite to the storm's travel, and they move from all directions into the thunderstorm. When the storm collapses and begins to release precipitation, wind directions reverse, gusting outward from the storm and generally gusting the strongest in the direction of the storm's travel.

When this downdraft of cold air, or downburst, reaches the ground, it blows dry, loose silt and clay (collectively, dust) up from the desert, creating a wall of airborne sediment that precedes the storm cloud. Often rain does not appear at ground level as it evaporates in the hot, dry air (a phenomenon known as virga). The evaporation cools the rushing air even further and accelerates it. Occasionally, when the rain does persist, it can contain a considerable quantity of dust. Severe cases are called mud storms. Eye and respiratory system protection is advisable for anyone who must be outside during a haboob. Moving to shelter is highly advised during a

Occurrence

Middle East 
Haboobs have been observed in the Sahara, Sahel (typically Sudan, where they were named and described), as well as across the Arabian Peninsula, throughout Kuwait, and in the most arid regions of Iraq. Haboob winds in the Arabian Peninsula, Iraq, and Kuwait are frequently created by the collapse of a thunderstorm.

North Africa 

African haboobs result from the northward summer shift of the Intertropical Convergence Zone into North Africa, bringing moisture from the Gulf of Guinea.

Australia 
Haboobs in Australia may be frequently associated with cold fronts.

North America 

As with haboobs in the Middle East, haboob occurrences in North America are often created by the collapse of a thunderstorm. This is a local or mesoscale event, and at times of extreme drought they can originate in agricultural regions. Some of the most famous dust storms of the Dust Bowl and similar conditions later were in fact synoptic scale events typically generated by a strong cold frontal passage, with storms on 11 November 1911, 9–11 May 1934, 14 April 1935, and 19 February 1954 having been particularly vivid examples.

The arid and semiarid regions of North America—in fact, any dry region—may experience haboobs. In North America, the most common terms for these events are either dust storm or sandstorm. In the U.S., they frequently occur in the deserts of Arizona, including around the cities of Yuma and Phoenix; in New Mexico, including Albuquerque, eastern California, and Texas. They also sometimes occur in the Columbia Basin of Eastern Washington, almost always leading to an impact on the city of Spokane. If these storms are strong enough, they can reach as far east as Post Falls and Moscow, in North Idaho.

Mars 
Global dust storms on Mars have been compared to haboobs on Earth.

Titan 
Dust storms of Titan observed in 2009 and 2010 have been compared to haboobs. However, the convective storm clouds are composed of liquid methane droplets, and the dust is likely composed of organic tholins.

See also

 Bora (wind)
 Dry thunderstorm
 Dust devil
 Intertropical Convergence Zone
 Khamsin
 Mistral (wind)
 Outflow boundary
 Simoom
 Sirocco

References

External links

 Haboob Photos @ HikeArizona.COM
 Haboobs, Arizona Department of Transportation.
 The Bibliography of Aeolian Research
 Haboob on Winds of the World
 
 Time-lapse video of the 5 July 2011 Arizona Haboob

Dust storms
Storm
Weather hazards